Mindaugas Panka (born 1 May 1984 in Alytus) is a former Lithuanian footballer. He made his name in Widzew Łódź where he played as defensive midfielder. There he made over 117 caps and scored 12 goals.

External links

 Career history at 90minut.pl

1984 births
Living people
Lithuanian footballers
Lithuania international footballers
People from Alytus
FK Dainava Alytus players
FC Vilnius players
Widzew Łódź players
Ruch Chorzów players
Hapoel Ironi Kiryat Shmona F.C. players
Maccabi Petah Tikva F.C. players
Hapoel Petah Tikva F.C. players
Hapoel Acre F.C. players
Ekstraklasa players
Israeli Premier League players
Liga Leumit players
Association football midfielders
Expatriate footballers in Poland
Expatriate footballers in Israel
Lithuanian expatriate sportspeople in Poland
Lithuanian expatriate sportspeople in Israel
FC Lokomotiv Moscow players